St. John Vianney Seminary (SJV) is a Catholic college seminary located on the campus of the University of St. Thomas in St. Paul, Minnesota. The seminary's mission is "to provide basic training today for tomorrow's Catholic priests." Seminarians undergo a four-year program of spiritual conferences and individual spiritual direction in order to help them grow strong in their Catholic faith and for vocational discernment.  The major seminary affiliated with SJV, the Saint Paul Seminary, is on the other side of the campus of the University of St. Thomas. Over 500 alumni had been ordained to the Catholic priesthood, including five who would go on to be bishops - one of whom, Blase J. Cupich, is a cardinal.

History

Background 
Prior to the founding of Saint John Vianney Seminary, students received their education in a "6-6" plan at Nazareth Hall Preparatory Seminary and the Saint Paul Seminary. Students would receive four years of high school education and two years of philosophy at Nazareth Hall, and two years of philosophy and four years of theology at the Saint Paul Seminary. In 1959, Archbishop William O. Brady ordered a feasibility study for a "4-4-4" plan for priestly formation: four years of study at Nazareth Hall, four years of study at the College of Saint Thomas, and four years of study at the Saint Paul Seminary. This plan was overwhelmingly supported. However, due to declining enrollment after the Second Vatican Council, by 1967 the 4-4-4 plan seemed no longer feasible and there was a stronger desire to create a college seminary at the University of St. Thomas and to close Nazareth Hall.

Establishment and Early Years 
Saint John Vianney Seminary was thus founded in 1968. It initially existed in Loras Hall and Credit Hall next to the Saint Paul Seminary, but the faculty of SPS were not pleased with the proximity the college seminary had to the major seminary. In 1972, the seminary residence moved to Brady Hall on campus of the College of St. Thomas. In January 1982, meetings were held to begin planning a separate dedicated building for the seminary. Groundbreaking for the new building took place in 1982. The new seminary building was constructed on the north campus of the University of St. Thomas, just northwest of Ireland Hall and east of Flynn Hall. The ground floor of the seminary has offices for the in-house priests and academic and administration staff, as well as guest rooms. A simple chapel was also constructed on the first floor. Four residence floors are above the ground floor.  The basement contains a recreation room, which was named the Pope Benedict XVI Room in the 2000s. Cardinal Ratzinger met with then-Rector Richard Pates in that room on a seminary visit in the 1970s. On display in the room is a zucchetto of Pope Benedict XVI, given to a seminarian from SJV who visited Rome and extended a new one to the Pope as he passed by; the Pontiff then exchanged the new one for his own.

2000s 
Enrollment throughout the 1980s and 1990s generally remained low. In 1999, Fr. Bill Baer was appointed rector and under his tenure, enrollment reached an all-time high.

2010s 
In 2010, Fr. Michael Becker was appointed as rector. In 2013, the seminary was the largest college seminary in the United States with over 130 seminarians and 27 sponsoring dioceses.  The seminarians at SJV represented about 10% of all college seminarians in the United States.

2020s 
The current rector of the seminary, Fr. Jonathan Kelly, was appointed  by Archbishop Bernard Hebda in 2020. In 2020, construction began on a new chapel that will be completed in 2023; the addition will also include additional guest rooms.

Student Life

Last Chance Mass
Last Chance Mass is an outreach offered by the seminary to the students of the University of St. Thomas and the surrounding community.  Every Sunday night at 9pm, Mass is offered in the SJV chapel to the general public by the rector of the Seminary, with refreshments following.  It was originally for the football players of the University of St. Thomas.

Caruso's Crew
When Coach Glenn Caruso took over the University of St. Thomas football team in 2008, he approached the men at the seminary and asked them to come and cheer on the Tommies at football games, as not many people attended them due to their losing record. Since then, the men of SJV have been some of the most active fans for the football team, attending every home game.  A subgroup of the seminarians, called "Caruso's Crew", dress up as hard hat workers and paint on faux moustaches.  The crew carry large tools made of cardboard and duct tape (a hammer, saw, wrench, and lunch box).  This group has been known to travel hundreds of miles to attend away games.

Sports 
At times, students of the seminary have played on the University of Saint Thomas football team, including Jordan Roberts, a Division One transfer.

Students yearly play in the Rector's Bowl, a flag football game against the Saint Paul Seminary.

Rectors 

 Bishop John Roach (1968-1971)
 Fr. Kenneth J. Pierre (1971-1981)
 Bishop Richard Pates (1981-1987)
 Fr. Kevin McDonough (1987-1990)
 Fr. Dale J. Korogi (1990-1992)
 Bishop Peter F. Christensen (1992-1999)
 Fr. William J. Baer (1999-2010)
 Fr. Michael Becker (2010–2020)
 Fr. Jonathan Kelly (2020–Present)

Notable alumni 

 Cardinal Blase Joseph Cupich of Chicago
 Archbishop Paul Dennis Etienne of Anchorage, Alaska
 Bishop John Francis Doerfler of Marquette, Michigan
 Bishop Donald DeGrood of Sioux Falls, South Dakota
 Bishop-elect Michael Izen
 Bishop Alexander Sample of Denver, Colorado

Sponsoring Dioceses
     
 Archdiocese of Anchorage-Juneau
 Diocese of Bismarck 
 Archdiocese of Chicago
 Diocese of Des Moines
 Diocese of Duluth  
 Diocese of Gaylord	
 Diocese of Grand Rapids
 Diocese of Green Bay	
  
 Diocese of Joliet-in-Illinois
 Diocese of Kalamazoo
 Diocese of Lafayette-in Indiana
 Diocese of La Crosse
 Diocese of Lansing
 Diocese of Milwaukee
 Archdiocese of Mobile
 Diocese of New Ulm
    
 Diocese of Saint Cloud
 Archdiocese of Saint Paul and Minneapolis
 Archdiocese of Omaha
 Diocese of Rockford
 Diocese of Saginaw
 Diocese of Sioux Falls
 Syro-Malabar Saint Thomas Diocese of Chicago

See also 

 St. John Vianney

References

External links 
 St. John Vianney Seminary

Roman Catholic Archdiocese of Saint Paul and Minneapolis
University of St. Thomas (Minnesota)
Catholic seminaries in the United States
Catholic seminaries